α,β-Unsaturated carbonyl compounds are organic compounds with the general structure (O=CR)−Cα=Cβ-R. Such compounds include enones and enals. In these compounds the carbonyl group is conjugated with an alkene (hence the adjective unsaturated). Unlike the case for carbonyls without a flanking alkene group, α,β-unsaturated carbonyl compounds are susceptible to attack by nucleophiles at the β-carbon. This pattern of reactivity is called vinylogous. Examples of unsaturated carbonyls are acrolein (propenal), mesityl oxide, acrylic acid, and maleic acid. Unsaturated carbonyls can be prepared in the laboratory in an aldol reaction and in the Perkin reaction.

Classifications
α,β-Unsaturated carbonyl compounds can be subclassified according to the nature of the carbonyl and alkene groups.

Acryloyl group

α,β-Unsaturated carbonyl compounds featuring a carbonyl conjugated to an alkene that is terminal, or vinylic, contain the acryloyl group (H2C=CH−C(=O)−); it is the acyl group derived from acrylic acid. The preferred IUPAC name for the group is prop-2-enoyl, and it is also known as acrylyl or simply (and incorrectly) as acryl. Compounds containing an acryloyl group can be referred to as "acrylic compounds".

α,β-Unsaturated acids, esters, and amides
An α,β-unsaturated acid is a type of α,β-unsaturated carbonyl compound that consists of an alkene conjugated to a carboxylic acid. The simplest example is acrylic acid (CH2=CHCO2H). These compounds are prone to polymerization, giving rise to the large area of acrylate plastics. Acrylate polymers are derived from but do not contain the acrylate group. The carboxyl group of acrylic acid can react with ammonia to form acrylamide, or with an alcohol to form an acrylate ester. Acrylamide and methyl acrylate are commercially important examples of α,β-unsaturated amides and α,β-unsaturated esters, respectfully. They also polymerize readily. Acrylic acid, its esters, and its amide derivatives feature the acryloyl group. 

α,β-Unsaturated dicarbonyls are also common. The parent compounds are maleic acid and the isomeric fumaric acid. Maleic acid forms esters, an imide, and an anhydride, i.e. diethyl maleate, maleimide, and maleic anhydride.  Fumaric acid, as fumarate, is an intermediate in the Krebs citric acid cycle, which is of great importance in bioenergy.

Enones

An enone (or alkenone) is an organic compound containing both alkene and ketone functional groups. In an α,β-unsaturated enone, the alkene is conjugated to the carbonyl group of the ketone. The simplest enone is methyl vinyl ketone (butenone, CH2=CHCOCH3). Enones are typically produced using an aldol condensation or Knoevenagel condensation. Some commercially significant enones produced by condensations of acetone are mesityl oxide (dimer of acetone) and phorone and isophorone (trimers).

In the Meyer–Schuster rearrangement, the starting compound is a propargyl alcohol. Another synthetically valuable method to access α,β-unsaturated carbonyls is via Selenoxide elimination. Cyclic enones can be prepared via the Pauson–Khand reaction.

Synthesis using regiospecific enolate formation and masked functionality

Regiospecific formation is the controlled enolate formation by the specific deprotonation at one of the α-carbons of the ketone starting molecule. This provides one of the best understood synthetic strategies to introduce chemical complexity in natural product and total syntheses. A prominent example of its use is in the total synthesis of progesterone illustrated in Figure "Regiospecific enolate formation in the total synthesis of progesterone".

When ketones are treated with base, enolates can be formed by deprotonation at either α-carbon. The selectivity is determined by both the steric and electronic effects on the α-carbons as well as the precise base used (see figure ""Masked functionality" for regiospecific enolate formation" for an example of this). Enolate formation will be thermodynamically favoured at the most acidic proton which depends on the electronic stabilization of the resulting anion. However, the selectivity can be reversed by sterically hindering the thermodynamic product and therefore kinetically favouring deprotonation at the other α-carbon centre. Traditional methods for regioselective enolate formation use either electronic activating groups (e.g. aldehydes) or steric blocking groups (e.g. 1,2-ethanedithiol protected ketone).

An enone can also serve as a precursor for regiospecific formation of an enolate, here the enone is a “masked functionality” for the enolate. This process is first described by Gilbert Stork who is best known for his contributions to the study of selective enolate formation methods in organic synthesis. Reacting an enone with lithium metal generates the enolate at the α-carbon of the enone. The enolate product can either be trapped or alkylated. By using “masked functionality”, it is possible to produce enolates that are not accessible by traditional methods.

The “masked functionality” approach to regiospecific enolate formation has been widely used in the total synthesis of natural products. For example, in the total synthesis of the steroid hormone progesterone, Stork and co-workers used the “masked functionality” to stereospecifically construct one of the quaternary carbons in the molecule.
-->

Enals
An enal (or alkenal) is an organic compound containing both alkene and aldehyde functional groups. In an α,β-unsaturated enal, the alkene is conjugated to the carbonyl group of the aldehyde (formyl group). The simplest enal is acrolein (CH2=CHCHO). Other examples include cis-3-hexenal (essence of mowed lawns) and cinnamaldehyde (essence of cinnamon).

Reactions of α,β-unsaturated carbonyls
α,β-Unsaturated carbonyls are electrophilic at both the carbonyl carbon as well as the β-carbon. Depending on conditions, either site is attacked by nucleophiles. Additions to the alkene are called conjugate additions. One type of conjugate addition is the Michael addition, which is used commercially in the conversion of mesityl oxide into isophorone. Owing to their extended conjugation, α,β-unsaturated carbonyls are prone to polymerization.  In terms of industrial scale, polymerization dominates the use of α,β-unsaturated carbonyls. Again because of their electrophilic character, the alkene portion of α,β-unsaturated carbonyls are good dienophiles in Diels–Alder reactions.  They can be further activated by Lewis acids, which bind to the carbonyl oxygen. α,β-Unsaturated carbonyls are good ligands for low-valent metal complexes, examples being Fe(bda)(CO)3 and tris(dibenzylideneacetone)dipalladium(0).

α,β-Unsaturated carbonyls are readily hydrogenated. Hydrogenation can target the carbonyl or the alkene (conjugate reduction) selectively, or both functional groups.

Enones undergo the Nazarov cyclization reaction and in the Rauhut–Currier reaction (dimerization).

α,β-Unsaturated thioesters
α,β-Unsaturated thioesters are intermediates in several enzymatic processes. Two prominent examples are coumaroyl-coenzyme A and crotonyl-coenzyme A. They arise by the action of acyl-CoA dehydrogenases. Flavin adenine dinucleotide (FAD) is a required co-factor.

Safety
Since α,β-unsaturated compounds are electrophiles and alkylating agents, many α,β-unsaturated carbonyl compounds are toxic. The endogenous scavenger compound glutathione naturally protects from toxic electrophiles in the body. Some drugs (amifostine, N-acetylcysteine) containing thiol groups may protect  from such harmful alkylation.

See also 
 2-alkenal reductase
 Enol

References

Functional groups
Conjugated ketones
Alkene derivatives